Yasmin Rehman is a Pakistani politician who served as member of the National Assembly of Pakistan.

She is sister of Muhammad Pervaiz Malik.

Political career
She was elected to the National Assembly of Pakistan as a candidate of Pakistan Peoples Party on a seat reserved for women from Punjab in the 2002 Pakistani general election.

She was re-elected to the National Assembly of Pakistan as a candidate of Pakistan Peoples Party on a seat reserved for women from Punjab in the 2008 Pakistani general election.

References

Living people
Year of birth missing (living people)
Pakistani MNAs 2008–2013
Pakistan People's Party politicians
Pakistani MNAs 2002–2007
Women members of the National Assembly of Pakistan
21st-century Pakistani women politicians